The 2015 Women's Hockey Junior Asia Cup was a field hockey tournament held in Changzhou, China between 5 – 13 September 2015.

The tournament served as a qualifier for the 2016 Women's Hockey Junior World Cup, held in Santiago, Chile in November and December 2016.

China won the tournament by defeating Japan 3–1 in a shoot-out, after the final finished a 2–2 draw. South Korea won the bronze medal by defeating India 3–2 in the third and fourth place playoff.

Teams
The following Under 21 teams from the Asian Hockey Federation competed in the tournament.

Results

Preliminary round

Pool A

Pool B

Classification round

Fifth to ninth place classification

Seventh to ninth place

Playoff

Seventh and eighth place

Fifth and sixth place

First to fourth place classification

Semi-finals

Third and fourth place

Final

Statistics

Final standings

Final rankings

References

Women's Hockey Junior Asia Cup
Junior Asia Cup
Hockey Junior Asia Cup
International women's field hockey competitions hosted by China
Hockey Junior Asia Women
Hockey Junior Asia Cup Women
Asia Cup